The 1947 Penn State Nittany Lions football team was an American football team that represented Pennsylvania State University (Penn State) as an independent during the 1947 college football season. In its 18th season under head coach Bob Higgins, the team compiled an undefeated 9–0–1 record, shut out six opponents, outscored opponents by a total of 332 to 40, and was ranked No. 4 in the final AP Poll. The team was 9–0 during the regular season and played No. 3 SMU to a tie in the 1948 Cotton Bowl Classic. The team played its home games in New Beaver Field in State College, Pennsylvania.

On defense, the team gave up an average of 4.0 points per game, the lowest total among all major college teams during the 1947 season.

Schedule

References

Penn State
Penn State Nittany Lions football seasons
Lambert-Meadowlands Trophy seasons
College football undefeated seasons
Penn State Nittany Lions football